Whanganui East is a suburb of Whanganui, in the Whanganui District and Manawatū-Whanganui region of New Zealand's North Island.

Demographics

It had a population of 6,156 at the 2018 New Zealand census, an increase of 336 people (5.8%) since the 2013 census, and an increase of 93 people (1.5%) since the 2006 census. There were 2,508 households. There were 2,829 males and 3,333 females, giving a sex ratio of 0.85 males per female, with 1,329 people (21.6%) aged under 15 years, 1,044 (17.0%) aged 15 to 29, 2,457 (39.9%) aged 30 to 64, and 1,329 (21.6%) aged 65 or older.

Ethnicities were 79.8% European/Pākehā, 30.8% Māori, 2.9% Pacific peoples, 2.6% Asian, and 1.0% other ethnicities (totals add to more than 100% since people could identify with multiple ethnicities).

The proportion of people born overseas was 9.7%, compared with 27.1% nationally.

Although some people objected to giving their religion, 48.6% had no religion, 36.2% were Christian, 0.4% were Hindu, 0.1% were Muslim, 0.2% were Buddhist and 5.2% had other religions.

Of those at least 15 years old, 528 (10.9%) people had a bachelor or higher degree, and 1,215 (25.2%) people had no formal qualifications. The employment status of those at least 15 was that 1,890 (39.2%) people were employed full-time, 699 (14.5%) were part-time, and 294 (6.1%) were unemployed.

Education

Notable people 

 Graeme Rodney Baker, QSM 2021

 Pushpa Devi Prasad, QSM 2022

References 

Suburbs of Whanganui
Settlements on the Whanganui River